Jamal Smith (born 16 October 1984) is a Barbadian cricketer. He made his first-class debut for the Combined Campuses and Colleges in the 2007–08 Carib Beer Series on 18 January 2008.

References

External links
 

1984 births
Living people
Barbadian cricketers
Barbados cricketers
Combined Campuses and Colleges cricketers